Jednotka (formerly STV1) is a Slovak television generalist channel owned and operated by public broadcasting, state-funded RTVS.

Programming

News and journalism
 Góly, body, sekundy (Goals, points, seconds) - sport news
 O 5 minút 12 (5 to 12 (o'clock)) - political debate
 Občan za dverami (Citizen behind the door) - programme about civil law disputes
 Počasie (Weather forecast)
 Ranné správy (Morning news)
 Reportéri (Reporters) 
 Slovensko v obrazoch (Slovakia in pictures) - interesting facts about Slovakia
 Správy RTVS (News RTVS) at 12:00, 16:00 (weekdays), 19:00 (daily)
 Svet v obrazoch (The world in pictures) - interesting facts about the world
 K11 – Kommissare im Einsatz (Die neuen Fälle) - Saturdays, 10:30

Entertainment
 5 proti 5 (5 vs 5) - Family Feud franchise
 Boris & Brambor - TV podcast
 Cestou necestou (Road or no road (literally))
 Čo ja viem (What Do I Know) 
 Dámsky klub (Women's club) - lifestyle magazine
 Duel - quiz show
Duel Junior - quiz show
 Folklorika - folklore magazine
 Milujem Slovensko (I love Slovakia) - I Love My Country (TV series) franchise
 Neskoro večer (Late evening) - Late-night talk show 
 Postav dom, zasaď strom (Build a house, plant a tree) - hobby, housing and gardening magazine
 Tajomstvo mojej kuchyne (The secret of my kitchen/cuisine)
 Záhady tela (Body mysteries) 
 Zem spieva (Land sings) - folklore singing and dancing competition
 Zlaté časy (Golden times)

Original series
 Doctor Martin - crime/comedy 2015 - 2016
 Hniezdo (The nest) - drama 2020
 Inspector Max - crime/comedy 2018
 Kolonáda (Colonnade) - family drama 2013
 Pumpa (Gas station) - sitcom ongoing
 Strážmajster Topinka (Sergeant Topinka) - crime/comedy 2019
 Tajné životy (Secret Lives) - drama 2015 - 2017

Former programming 
 Čierna alebo biela (Black or white)
 Futbal (Football)
Hádaj, kto nás pozval? (Guess, who invited us?)
 Hit Storočia (Hit of the Century)
 Milionár (Millionaire) - Who Wants to Be a Millionaire? franchise
 Ranný magazín (Morning magazine)
 Ruku na to (Deal) - Deal or No Deal franchise
 Si v obraze? (Are you in the picture?)
 Slovensko hľadá SuperStar (Slovak Idol) - Pop Idol franchise
 S.O.S.
 Svadba snov (Dream wedding) - Love letters franchise
 Taxík (Taxi) - Cash Cab franchise

Foreign series
(currently broadcasting)
 Die Bergretter
 Don Matteo
 The District
 Fireman Sam
 Hercule Poirot
Hudson & Rex
 Lekarze
 Les Chamois
 Spyashchie
 Victoria (British TV series)
 Peppa Pig
 Pingu
 Postman Pat
 Pysamesky
 LazyTown (Lekiovia)
 Mr. Men and Little Miss (Menekovia a Menikovia)
(former broadcasting)

 Baywatch
 Desperate Housewives
 Der Clown
 DuckTales
 Hannah Montana
 House M.D.
 Kim Possible
 Knight Rider
 Law & Order: Special Victims Unit
 Matlock
 Medicopter 117 – Jedes Leben zählt
 Mr. Bean
 The Addams Family
 The Flintstones
 The Scooby-Doo Show
 The Simpsons
 The Yogi Bear Show
 Thomas & Friends
 Tom and Jerry

Notable presenters 

 Petra Ázacis (2008–2011, 2021–present)
 Ľubomír Bajaník (1996–present)
 Viktor Blažek (1996–2002)
 Monika Bruteničová (1996–1999)
 Katarína Brychtová (2004–present)
 Andrej Bičan (2000–2003, 2007–present)
 Andrea Bugošová (1972–1999)
 Veronika Cifrová Ostrihoňová (2021–present)
 Jozef Dúbravský (2007–2008)
 Michal Dyttert (2001–2002)
 Marianna Ďurianová (2000–2001, 2018–present)
 Ľudmila Farkašovská (2004)
 Marcel Forgáč (2002, 2007–2008, 2011–present)
 Lucia Forman Habancová (2007–2012)
 Marián Gáborík (2020–present)
 Oľga Hamadejová (2008–present)
 Alena Heribanová (1979–present)
 Ľuboš Hlavena (2007–present)
 Kveta Horváthová (1995–1996, 2007–2011)
 Michal Hudák (2010–2012)
 Ján Hudok (1994–present)
 Andrea Chabroňová (2000–present)
 Ivan Janda (1992–1996, 2004–2008)
 Erika Judínyová (2000–2005)
 Adriana Kmotríková (1990–2000)
 Peter Kočiš (1995–2004, 2010–present)
 Ján Koleník (2005–2006)
 Rastislav Konečný (2021–present)
 Eugen Korda (2004–2007)
 Kristína Kormúthová (2008–2014)
 Maroš Košík (2008–2010)
 Michal Kovačič (2004–2008)
 Jana Košíková (2011–present)
 Dano Kováč (2011–2013)
 Miloslav Kováč (1993–2006)
 Stanislava Kováčik (2007–2008)
 Jarmila Lajčáková-Hargašová (1995–1996, 2005–present)
 Katrin Lengyelová (2000–2002)
 Richard Lintner (2021–present)
 Jana Majeská (1995–present)
 Peter Marcin (1998–2003, 2009–present)
 Gregor Mareš (1998–2000, 2009–present)
 Ján Mečiar (2004–2008)
 Marcel Merčiak (1997–present)
 Iveta Malachovská (1989–1996, 2006–present)
 Marián Miezga (2017–present)
 Miroslav Michalech (1982–2003)
 Soňa Müllerová (1985–2003, 2008–present)
 Martin Nikodým (1995–1996, 2007–present)
 Mária Ölvedyová (2004–2007)
 Lucia Palšovičová (2007–2013)
 Andrea Pálffy Belányiová (2004–2005)
 Mária Pietrová (2005–2012)
 Ján Plesník (1981–2015)
 Roman Pomajbo (2004–2008)
 Zlatica Puškárová (1997–1999)
 Vladimír Seman (1986–2004)
 Michal Slanička (2003–present)
 Viliam Stankay (1997–present)
 Andrea Stoklasová (1994–1998, 2001–2008)
 Dana Španková Roháčová (2004–2007)
 Janette Štefánková (2006–present)
 Alfonz Šuran (1995–1998, 2022–present)
 Alexander Štefuca (2002–2003, 2005–2008, 2015–2021)
 Andrea Ušiaková (2001–2003)
 Andrea Vadkerti (2004–2011)
 Boris Valábik (2018–present)
 Adela Vinczeová (2002, 2004–present)
 Vladimír Vondrák (2008–2011)
 Vladimír Voštinár (2000–2002)
 Milan Zimnýkoval (2006–present)
 Natália Žembová (2006–2014)

Logos and identities

References

External links 
Official website
TV program Jednotka

Mass media in Slovakia
Television channels in Slovakia
Television channels and stations established in 1956
Television channels and stations established in 1993
Radio and Television of Slovakia